Milyutin (Russian: Милютин) is a Russian masculine surname originating from the root "mil-", meaning "dear", "cute"; its feminine counterpart is Milyutina. It may refer to the following notable people:

 Dmitry Milyutin (1816–1912), Russian war minister 
 Nikolay Milyutin (1818–1872), Russian statesman, brother of Dmitry
 Nikolay Alexandrovich Milyutin (1899–1942), Russian Bolshevik and urban planner
 Oleksiy Milyutin (born 1995), Ukrainian football player
 Vadim Milyutin (born 2002), Russian football player

References

Russian-language surnames